The Last Express is an adventure video game designed by Jordan Mechner and published by Broderbund in 1997 for PC. Players take on the role of an American who accepts an invite by a friend to join them on the Orient Express, days before the start of World War I, only to become involved in a maelstrom of treachery, lies, political conspiracies, personal interests, romance and murder, upon boarding the train. The game is unique in how it was created, its non-linear story, and in how events in the game are conducted within real-time.

The game was a commercial disappointment following its release, but received highly positive reviews and a positive post-release response. A Sony PlayStation port was in development, but was cancelled before it was finished. The game was later reacquired by Mechner, who worked with DotEmu to make portable versions of the game for iOS and Android, and later released a remade version for Steam, entitled The Last Express – Gold Edition.

Gameplay 
The game operates primarily from a first-person perspective of the story's lead character when they explore the train, with cutscenes being conducted in the third-person. Gameplay takes place almost entirely within real-time, albeit accelerated by a factor of six; the only time when it is not conducted so is when the player's character sleeps at certain intervals and when the player is on the game's pause menu. Events within the game are scripted and thus occur at specific times denoted by the in-game clock – for example, a character leaving their compartment in order to go to the restaurant car in order to have lunch. When on the pause menu, the player can rewind time, either to a specific point, or to a specific destination on the express' route (i.e. Paris), or the player can fast forward to a later time, up until the current point in the story that they have reached.

The main areas of the game are within the carriages of the train, with the player able to look around each place they are in, move down corridors, enter and leave compartments, knock on doors, and talk to people. Items within the game can be interacted with, either to be examined, or in some cases, collected by the player for use later on. The game's story features around thirty characters, each of whom has their own artificial intelligence and individual agendas – they therefore conduct actions that allow them to complete their own personal goals, only changing their plans due to player intervention - with the game using a non-linear approach of story-telling, in which the player's actions or in-actions, affect how the story plays out; the game's many events led to its script being around 800 pages long.

The story features multiple endings, depending on the player's actions. Around thirty of these are game overs, involving the main character being killed or arrested. Four are alternate endings; only one of these is the "true" ending.

Story

Setting 
The game's story takes place in 1914, between 24 and 27 July, on the last journey made by the Orient Express from Paris to Constantinople (modern Istanbul) before the outbreak of World War I. Much of the game's events occur within the train itself, which consists of two baggage cars, a restaurant car, two sleeping cars, and a private car. The plot written for the game includes many elements of a mystery, including murder, secret plots and deals, lies and personal agendas, as well as featuring notable references to political climates in Europe.

Plot 

Robert Cath, an American doctor on the run from the British and French police, both of whom suspect he was involved in the murder of an Irish police officer, accepts an invite from his friend Tyler Whitney to join him on the Orient Express, in regards to an important deal he has made. Forced to board the train while it is heading out of Paris, Cath discovers Whitney dead in his compartment, with the only clues he finds being: a mysterious scroll written in Russian and consisting of a simple fairytale; an elaborately designed box that is empty; and a purple and gold scarf with the letter "W" embroidered on it. Assuming his friend's identity and dealing with his body, Cath decides to investigate, and finds a few people of interest amongst the train's passengers: August Schmidt, a German arms dealer whom Whitney had been in contact with; Anna Wolff, an Austrian violinist whom Cath has suspicions about; Vassili Obolensky, a Russian count travelling with his granddaughter, Tatiana Obolenskaya; Alexei Dolnikov, a Russian anarchist and a childhood friend of Tatiana; and Sophie de Bretheuill and Rebecca Norton, a pair of women travelling together.

Sometime after dinner is served, Cath finds himself invited to meet with Kronos, a mysterious art collector travelling in a private car with his African servant Kahina, who reveals that Whitney had arranged to exchange an item called the "Firebird" for a large sum of gold, and that he is aware of who Cath is. Shortly after the meeting, Cath finds himself encountering Miloš Jovanović, a Serbian travelling with a group of associates, who mistakenly believes he murdered Whitney until Cath sets him straight, only to learn that his friend had made a deal with him, but learns little on the details. Unable to sleep that night, Cath visits Anna in her compartment upon finding she is still awake, only to be forced at gunpoint to reveal who he is when she informs him that she knows he is not Whitney, having been in his friend's compartment upon his arrival on the train. Anna finds herself forced to drop the matter after the pair overhear Obolensky having a panic attack. Shortly after Cath helps to treat him as best as he can, he eavesdrops on Anna asking Tatiana to look after something important.

The next day, Cath has a meeting with Miloš, who reveals that he and his associate are part of a Serbian outfit called the Black Hand, and learns of the agreement made between Whitney and a Serbian general. Having helped with supporting foreign liberty causes, Whitney had agreed to supply a large cache of weapons to the Serbians, and was given one of Serbia's national treasures to help with the purchase – an elaborately designed music box called the Firebird, which assumes the form of a golden egg when closed, but when opened in a special way, transforms into a beautiful singing mechanical bird, and a whistle designed in the form of a scarab beetle. Whitney had arranged to sell the treasure to Kronos, in exchange for gold coins that he would then use to purchase the arms from Schmidt. With no gold and the treasure missing, Cath finds he must recover them and complete the deal with Schmidt, or face severe consequences.

After the meeting, Cath has another meeting with Kronos, whom he finds to be a dangerous and ruthless man, while recovering the whistle from a young French boy, travelling with his family, after he had found it in one of the cars. After the Express departs from Munich with Schmidt's weapons, Cath encounters an Englishman named George Abbot, who is notably inquisitive of his actions the previous night, but also points out certain details that make him uneasy about Abbot's intentions. When Kronos arranges for most of the passengers to attend a small concert in his private car, Cath takes advantage of it to search the compartments of the sleeping cars, finding a letter in Anna's possessions that exposes her as an Austrian spy, and another letter in Schmidt's luggage that makes him suspicious of why he is supplying the Serbians with weapons, before eventually finding the Firebird in Tatiana's compartment, having been entrusted with it by Anna when she found it in Whitney's compartment.

Not trusting Kronos, Cath hides the treasure, and then finds his way into Kronos' private chambers to borrow the gold he brought along, in order to keep the deal with Schmidt in place. After being forced to return the gold to Kronos at gunpoint before he must leave the train at Vienna, Cath later prevents the Serbians from killing Anna when she decides to investigate the baggage car. Despite him saving her, Anna reveals she was on the train to uncover what the Black Hand were up to, and plans to inform the Austrian authorities at Budapest.

Shortly after the train departs Vienna, Tatiana informs Cath that Alexei intends to murder her grandfather, in regards to certain injustices made against Alexei's father, by detonating a bomb placed on the train. Agreeing to help, Cath finds a detonator within Alexei's compartment and removes it to prevent the bomb being used. Later that night, Cath awakens to a disturbance, and finds Alexei fatally wounded in Obolensky's compartment during a confrontation between the two men; his death mentally scars Tatiana as a direct result. Shortly after finding and defusing a second bomb Alexei crafted, Cath meets with Abbot and discovers him to be a British spy, who had boarded the train to track down a Russian anarchist; knowing who Cath is, Abbot reveals that he suspects him to be innocent in the murder in Ireland, and so offers to clear his name as a result of his actions when he gets into contact with the British authorities.

Cath soon visits Anna in her compartment, and the pair develop a romantic relationship. Just as the train begins to reach Budapest, Miloš orders the Black Hand to take over the train and keep it moving, while holding the passengers and staff prisoner, and having Cath and Anna put into the train's rear baggage car. Freeing himself, Cath releases Anna, before dealing with the Serbians, and releasing the passengers and staff, all of whom return to the sleeping cars, except for Abbot, Tatiana, Obolensky, and Anna. Cath then separates the sleeping cars from the train, but not before informing Schmidt of who he really is and that he had been set up by the Germans and Austrians into selling weapons to the Serbians, in order to give both countries an excuse to invade the Balklands. Proceeding to the locomotive, Cath confronts Miloš, who is promptly killed by Anna, before keeping the train going and refusing to be stopped by Anna. After the group cross the border into Serbia and narrowly escape pursuit by a Serbian military train, Anna reluctantly accepts the situation and decides to flee with Cath to Jerusalem.

As the train begins to reach its final destination at Constantinople, Cath and Anna are confronted by Kronos and Kahina, both of whom had secretly followed the train and re-boarded it when it had stopped at a station. Revealing that they seek to possess the Firebird and knowing that Cath still has it, Kronos orders him at gunpoint to retrieve it and then open it in his presence, before forcing Anna to play her violin and make it sing. Satisfied that he finally has what he wants and seeing the sun setting, Kronos orders the Firebird to be closed, but Cath refuses. Instead, he blows on the treasure's whistle, causing the Firebird to become a living weapon and lash out against Kronos and Kahina and kill both of them, revealing to Cath how Whitney had died; in the chaos that is caused, both he and Anna jump from the train, just as it pulls into Sirkeci Station. A disturbed Tatiana, wishing for no more war, soon finds explosives amongst the Serbians' weapons and uses Alexei's lighter to detonate them, killing herself, Abbot and Obolensky, and destroying the train. As Cath and Anna survey the devastation, the pair overhear a Turkish boy crying out that war has broken out in Europe. Realising that she must return home, Anna promises Robert that she will see him again when the war is over ("no longer than a month"), before parting ways with him. The camera fades to a map of Europe which time-lapses national borders from 1914 to 1994, implying the couple's relationship is swept away with time as well.

History
Mechner founded Smoking Car Productions to create The Last Express. The company was located in San Francisco from 1993 to 1997 and at its peak had sixty full-time employees.

Mechner derived inspiration for The Last Express from Myst and Infocom's Deadline. He saw The Last Express as an opportunity to create a game with a complexity of story and depth of characters comparable to that seen in a film, something he felt he could not accomplish with his games for the Apple II due to hardware limitations. He said of the game's approach to storytelling:

Art production 

The game is notable for its unique art style, with characters illustrated in the "art nouveau" style that was popular in 1914, the year the game's events take place. Since illustrating a game of this magnitude by hand would likely take an exorbitant amount of time, the look was achieved by using rotoscoping, a process that Mechner had used in Prince of Persia. During a 22-day-long live-action video shoot, every action by every character in the game was photographed by actors wearing distinctive makeup and costumes against a bluescreen on 16mm film and digitized. From this, a limited number of frames were selected and put through a patented process developed in house, where the frames first had all their colour removed. Next, a powerful computer program created black-and-white line drawings of the frames; these were coloured by hand. The finished product has 40,000 frames.

Publishing 
Following a bidding war between several major game publishers, Brøderbund, SoftBank, and GameBank split the worldwide distribution rights. Dubbed versions of the game were released in French, German, Spanish, Italian, Russian (unofficial bootlegged localization), and Japanese.

Release 
The game was released 1997, after five years of development, at a final cost of US$5–6million, on a multi-platform 3-CD set that covered Windows, Mac OS, and MS-DOS. The Last Express received highly positive reviews both in print and online, but only remained in stores for a few months.

Broderbund did little to promote the game, apart from a brief mention in a press release and enthusiastic statements by Broderbund executives, in part due to the entire Broderbund marketing team quitting in the weeks before its release. Softbank pulled out of the game market, dissolved its subsidiary GameBank, and cancelled several dozen titles in development, including the nearly finished PlayStation port of The Last Express. In a final blow, Broderbund was acquired by The Learning Company, which was not interested in The Last Express. Within a year of its release, The Last Express was out of print. Withal, Mechner's company Smoking Car Productions quietly folded.

Soundtrack 

Running thirty-nine minutes, the soundtrack for The Last Express was published by Intrada Records in 2000, but is no longer in print. It was composed, orchestrated, and conducted by American composer born in Czechoslovakia, Elia Cmiral, who later composed the scores for Ronin and Stigmata. Consisting of a mix of dominant synth instruments and occasional solo violin, the score was recorded at Forte Muzika Studios in Los Angeles. The lone exception is the Sonata for Violin and Piano in A major by César Franck featured in the game's concert scene.

As of May 2011, the soundtrack is included as a digital release given away free with the DotEmu and GOG.com versions of The Last Express.

Reception 
In 2008, producer Mark Netter declared that The Last Express was "a total commercial failure." Shortly before its launch, the sales and marketing department at publisher Broderbund left the company. As a result, the game received very little marketing to support its release. The game's global distribution was divided between Broderbund, GAMEBANK, and its parent company SoftBank Group. However, SoftBank soon exited the game industry and closed GAMEBANK, which resulted in the cancellation of a "nearly finished PlayStation port of Express", according to programmer Mark Moran.

The Last Express achieved sales of 100,000 units by 2000, and failed to break even. Netter noted that, given its $5-million-dollar budget, The Last Express "would have had to be one of the top-selling games of all time" to recoup its development costs. Moran said that it was ultimately one million sales short of breaking even.

Following the purchase of Broderbund by The Learning Company, the publisher's business was restructured to focus exclusively on edutainment software. The Last Express soon went out of print. Netter noted in 2008, "By the summer of 1997, two months after it had been released, you could no longer buy it." These problems, according to Chris Remo of Gamasutra, left The Last Express "unable to reach the long tail sales on which adventure games traditionally had thrived." GameSpot's Bruce Geryk argued in 2000 that the failure of The Last Express could "in some ways be considered the beginning of the end for the adventure genre."

Critical reviews

The Last Express received highly positive reviews. Critics hailed the game's authentic and compelling period ambiance, complex and unpredictable story, captivating musical score, and unique visual style. Many said that they were compelled to eavesdrop on the various characters' conversations simply to follow their subplots, which give the player the sensation of really being on a train.

The voice acting was also widely praised for the convincing performances and authentic foreign accents. Reactions to the real-time system were more mixed; some said that, while it adds to the tension and immersion in the game, it often requires the player to rewatch numerous scenes when they fail, or sit and wait when they accomplish a segment's tasks early. A few also found that the game does not implement enough originality in its interface or puzzles, too often feeling like another generic adventure game. Next Generation concluded that "Enjoyment of The Last Express depends mostly on one's appreciation for the story and one's acceptance of the standard mechanics. As an attempt at something different, however, we liked it." Computer Gaming World was more enthusiastic, calling it "a captivating look at real-life events from a semi-fictional adventure gaming angle", and GameSpot stated that "through its use of real time and brilliant writing, the game ups the ante for storytelling in gaming."

The editors of Macworld named The Last Express the best role-playing game of 1997. Steven Levy and Cameron Crotty of the magazine wrote, "What makes The Last Express vividly memorable is the painstaking detail, particularly the lush score and the faithfully rendered sounds of the most famous train ever. So while you may never solve this three-disc conundrum, you'll never forget the ride."

The Last Express was a runner-up for Computer Gaming Worlds, CNET Gamecenter's and GameSpot's 1997 "Adventure Game of the Year" awards, which went variously to The Curse of Monkey Island and Dark Earth. The editors of Computer Gaming World called The Last Express "the year's best mystery" and "stylish and intriguing", and those of GameSpot wrote, "While a few minor gameplay problems held it back from the top spot, there is no doubt that The Last Express is one of the best adventure games of the last few years." Regardless, The Last Express did win GameSpot's 1997 "Best Story" award, and was also the runner-up for the 1997 "Best Ending" award, which went to Fallout.

In 2000, Computer Games Strategy Plus named The Last Express one of the "10 Essential Graphic Adventures". The magazine's Steve Bauman wrote, "While it received terrific reviews, and its innovative storytelling engine should have pointed toward a bold new future for interactive fiction, it had disastrously low sales, essentially bankrupting the company that produced it and telling the industry that consumers weren't interested in this type of game." In 2010, the game was included as one of the titles in the book 1001 Video Games You Must Play Before You Die. In 2011, Adventure Gamers named The Last Express the seventh-best adventure game ever released.

Legacy

Re-release 
In 2000, the Fallout video game series creator and game publisher Interplay bought the lapsed rights and began quietly selling the game as a budget title. A short time later, Interplay went bankrupt; once again, the game went out of print. In 2006, the American subscription-based game service GameTap began offering the game on its network.

On January 14, 2011, DotEmu released the Collector's Edition of the game, which includes the soundtrack, a making-of video and a walkthrough. On January 26, 2011, Phoenix Licensing (the current copyright holder of the game) re-released the game in GOG.com, with all the extras of the Collector's Edition –except the walkthrough– and only in English.

Mobile ports 
Mechner was later able to reacquire the rights to the game and worked in 2012 with DotEmu to release iOS and Android ports of the title. On March 16, 2012, Mechner announced an upcoming release of the game for iOS devices, with "additional enhancements to make it more iOS-friendly." The iOS version (iPad, iPhone and iPod Touch) of the games was released on September 27 by DotEmu.com and is available in the App Store. A version for Android was released on August 28, 2013, through the Google Play Store.

On November 21, 2013, DotEmu released also a Gold Edition for Windows on Steam. It adds improved user interface and inventory, advanced hint system, achievements, and cloud save support. It was released for macOS on March 17, 2015.

Film adaptation
On April 13, 2010, MTV's Movies Blog posted an excerpt from a recent interview with Dutch film director Paul Verhoeven. In the interview, Verhoeven is quoted as saying, "I am working on a movie now that is... situated in 1914. Basically, Indiana Jones-ish you could say, but also Hitchcockian." He also states that the source material is a video game, and that "the writer of the video game has asked me to keep [the identity of the game] secret until he has a script." Subsequently, several other websites speculated that the video game in question is The Last Express, considering the relative dearth of games set in 1914, as well as Jordan Mechner's work on the film version of Prince of Persia: The Sands of Time.

In October 2011, Verhoeven confirmed that he is working with Mechner to develop a film adaptation of the game. The film would most likely be filmed in 3D, although it may not be Verhoeven's immediate next project.

Notes and references

External links 
  (archived)
 
 
 Gamasutra interview with producer Mark Netter and technical designer and lead programmer Mark Moran (2008)
 The Last Express on game designer Jordan Mechner website

1997 video games
Adventure games
Point-and-click adventure games
First-person adventure games
Android (operating system) games
Broderbund games
Cancelled PlayStation (console) games
Windows games
DOS games
Classic Mac OS games
MacOS games
IOS games
Interplay Entertainment games
Works set on the Orient Express
Single-player video games
Video games set in Austria
Video games set in Europe
Video games set in France
Video games set in Germany
Video games set in Hungary
Video games set in Serbia
Video games set in Turkey
Video games set in the 1910s
Video games set in 1914
Video games with historical settings
Video games with rotoscoped graphics
Fiction about murder
World War I video games
Art Nouveau works
Games commercially released with DOSBox
Video games set in the British Empire
Video games developed in the United States